Aksel (Akseli) Vilhelm Brander (18 April 1876 – 3 October 1958) was a Finnish agronomist, educationist, farmer and politician. He was a member of the Parliament of Finland from 1933 to 1951, representing the Agrarian League. He was born in Kitee, and was the younger brother of Augusta Laine and of Uuno and Helena Brander.

References

1876 births
1958 deaths
People from Kitee
People from Kuopio Province (Grand Duchy of Finland)
Centre Party (Finland) politicians
Members of the Parliament of Finland (1933–36)
Members of the Parliament of Finland (1936–39)
Members of the Parliament of Finland (1939–45)
Members of the Parliament of Finland (1945–48)
Members of the Parliament of Finland (1948–51)
People of the Finnish Civil War (White side)
Finnish people of World War II